Year 977 (CMLXXVII) was a common year starting on Monday (link will display the full calendar) of the Julian calendar.

Events 
 By place 
 Europe 
 May – Boris II, dethroned emperor (tsar) of Bulgaria, and his brother Roman manage to escape from captivity in Constantinople. They reach the Bulgarian border, but Boris is killed by mistake by the border guards. Roman is crowned as new ruler, although leadership and the control of the army remain in the hands of General Samuel (a member of the Cometopuli Dynasty).
 War of the Three Henries: Henry III (the Younger), duke of Carinthia, gets involved in a conflict over the Patriarchate of Aquileia (March of Verona) in northeastern Italy. Emperor Otto II (the Red) decides in Aquileia's favor, prompting Henry III to go into revolt. He joins forces with Henry II (the Wrangler), duke of Bavaria. They are both joined by Henry I, bishop of Augsburg.
 August – Otto II appoints his cousin Charles, illegitimate son of the late King Louis IV (d'Outremer), as duke of Lorraine. King Lothair III – who claims the duchy as his own territory – declares war to the Holy Roman Empire. He leads an expedition into Lorraine accompanied by Hugh Capet. Lothair crosses the Meuse River and takes Aachen, sacking the imperial palace.
 Fall – Otto II invades the West Frankish Kingdom accompanied by Charles and ravages the cities of Reims, Soissons (where he halts at the Abbey of Saint Médard for devotions) and Laon. Lothair III escapes and flees to Paris, where he is besieged by imperial forces. Charles is proclaimed 'King of the Franks' by Dietrich I, bishop of Metz, at Laon.
 November 30 – Otto II is unable to take Paris, he lifts the siege of the capital and withdraws. A Frankish army under Lothair III pursues and defeats the imperial rearguard while crossing the Aisne River. Otto escapes and is forced to take refuge at Aachen with Charles, after his supplies are destroyed.

 England 
 King Kenneth II of Scotland kills his rival Amlaíb mac Illuilb (or Amlaíb), brother of the late King Cuilén, to establish himself as Cuilén's successor.

 Arabian Empire 
 Spring – Sabuktigin, a Samanid general, succeeds his father-in-law Alp-Tegin as governor of Ghazna (modern Afghanistan). He enlarges his dominions and founds the Ghaznavid Dynasty.
 Summer – 'Adud al-Dawla, ruler (shah) of the Buyid Dynasty, drives the Hamdanids out of Mosul and tries to unify the country. Abu Taghlib is forced to flee to the Byzantine city of Antzitene.
 Emir Sa'd al-Dawla recovers his capital, Aleppo, from the ghulam Bakjur, who receives the governorship of Homs as compensation.

 By topic 
 Religion 
 Æthelwold, bishop of Winchester, rebuilds the western end of the Old Minster, with twin towers and no apses (approximate date).
 The Imam Ali Mosque, located in Najaf (modern Iraq), is completed by 'Adud al-Dawla.

Births 
 March 4 – Al-Musabbihi, Fatimid historian (d. 1030)
 Fujiwara no Teishi, Japanese empress consort (d. 1001)
 Kōkei, Japanese Buddhist monk (approximate date)
 Poppo, abbot of Stavelot-Malmedy (d. 1048)

Deaths 
 March 1 – Rudesind, Galician bishop (b. 907)
 November 8 – Ibn al-Qūṭiyya, Andalusian historian
 December 20 – Fujiwara no Kanemichi, Japanese statesman (b. 925)
 Amlaíb mac Illuilb, king of Alba (Scotland)
 Ashot III (the Merciful), king of Armenia
 Bisutun, ruler of the Ziyarid Dynasty
 Boris II, emperor of the Bulgarian Empire
 Dobrawa, duchess consort of the Polans
 Gisulf I, prince of Salerno (approximate date)
 Guo Zhongshu, Chinese painter and calligrapher
 Ivar of Limerick, Norse Viking king
 Kamo no Yasunori, Japanese spiritual advisor (b. 917)
 Oleg, prince of the Drevlyans
 Peter, Byzantine eunuch general
 Sideman, bishop of Crediton

References